Chamunda (Sanskrit: चामुण्डा, ISO-15919: Cāmuṇḍā), also known as Chamundeshwari, Chamundi or Charchika, is a fearsome form of Chandi, the Hindu Divine Mother Shakti and is one of the seven Matrikas (mother goddesses).

She is also one of the chief Yoginis, a group of sixty-four or eighty-one Tantric goddesses, who are attendants of the warrior goddess Parvati. The name is a combination of Chanda and Munda, two monsters whom Chamunda killed. She is closely associated with Kali, another fierce aspect of Parvati. She is identified with goddesses Parvati, Kali or Durga.

The goddess is often portrayed as residing in cremation grounds or around holy fig trees. The goddess is worshipped by ritual animal sacrifices along with offerings of wine. The practice of animal sacrifices has become less common with Shaivite and Vaishnavite influences.

Origins
Ramakrishna Gopal Bhandarkar says that Chamunda was originally a tribal goddess, worshipped by the tribals of the Vindhya mountains in central India. These tribes were known to offer goddesses animal as well as human sacrifices along with rituals offering liquor. These methods of worship were retained in Tantric worship of Chamunda, after assimilation into Hinduism. He proposes the fierce nature of this goddess is due to her association with Rudra (Shiva), identified with fire god Agni at times. Wangu also backs the theory of the tribal origins of the goddess.

Iconography

The black or red coloured Chamunda is described as wearing a garland of severed heads or skulls (Mundamala). She is described as having four, eight, ten or twelve arms, holding a Damaru (drum), trishula (trident), sword, a snake, skull-mace (khatvanga), thunderbolt, a severed head and panapatra (drinking vessel, wine cup) or skull-cup (kapala), filled with blood. Standing on a corpse of a man (shava or preta) or seated on a defeated demon or corpse (pretasana). Chamunda is depicted adorned by ornaments of bones, skulls, and serpents.  She also wears a Yajnopavita (a sacred thread worn by mostly Hindu priests) of skulls. She wears a jata mukuta, that is, headdress formed of piled, matted hair tied with snakes or skull ornaments. Sometimes, a crescent moon is seen on her head. Her eye sockets  are described as burning the world with flames. She is accompanied by evil spirits. She is also shown to be surrounded by skeletons or ghosts and beasts like jackals, who are shown eating the flesh of the corpse which the goddess sits or stands on. The jackals and her fearsome companions are sometimes depicted as drinking blood from the skull-cup or blood dripping from the severed head, implying that Chamunda drinks the blood of the defeated enemies. This quality of drinking blood is a usual characteristic of all Matrikas, and Chamunda in particular. At times, she is depicted seated on an owl, her vahana (mount or vehicle) or buffalo and or Dhole. Her banner figures an eagle.

These characteristics, a contrast to usual Hindu goddess depiction with full breasts and a beautiful face, are symbols of old age, death, decay and destruction. Chamunda is often said as a form of Kali, representing old age and death. She appears as a frightening old woman,  projecting fear and horror.

Hindu legends

In Hindu scripture Devi Mahatmya, Chamunda emerged as Chandika Jayasundara from an eyebrow of goddess Kaushiki, a goddess created from "sheath" of Durga and was assigned the task of eliminating the demons Chanda and Munda, generals of demon kings Shumbha-Nishumbha. She fought a fierce battle with the demons, ultimately killing them.

According to a later episode of the Devi Mahatmya, Durga created Matrikas from herself and with their help slaughtered the demon army of Shumbha-Nishumbha. In this version, Kali is described as a Matrika who sucked all the blood of the demon Raktabīja, from whose blood drop rose another demon. Kali is given the epithet Chamunda in the text. Thus, the Devi Mahatmya identifies Chamunda with Kali.

In the Varaha Purana, the story of Raktabija is retold, but here each of Matrikas appears from the body of another Matrika. Chamunda appears from the foot of the lion-headed goddess Narasimhi. Here, Chamunda is considered a representation of the vice of tale-telling (pasunya). The Varaha Purana text clearly mentions two separate goddesses Chamunda and Kali, unlike Devi Mahatmya.

According to another legend, Chamunda appeared from the frown of the benign goddess Parvati to kill demons Chanda and Munda. Here, Chamunda is viewed as a form of Parvati.

The Matsya Purana tells a different story of Chamunda's origins. She with other matrikas was created by Shiva to help him kill the demon Andhakasura, who has an ability - like Raktabīja - to generate from his dripping blood. Chamunda with the other matrikas drinks the blood of the demon ultimately helping Shiva kill him. Ratnakara, in his text Haravijaya, also describes this feat of Chamunda, but solely credits Chamunda, not the other matrikas of sipping the blood of Andhaka. Having drunk the blood, Chamunda's complexion changed to blood-red. The text further says that Chamunda does a dance of destruction, playing a musical instrument whose shaft is Mount Meru, the string is the cosmic snake Shesha and gourd is the crescent moon. She plays the instrument during the deluge that drowns the world.

Association with Matrikas

Chamunda is one of the saptamatrikas or Seven Mothers. The Matrikas are fearsome mother goddesses, abductors and eaters of children; that is, they were emblematic of childhood pestilence, fever, starvation, and disease. They were propitiated in order to avoid those ills, that carried off so many children before they reached adulthood.
Chamunda is included in the Saptamatrika (seven Matrikas or mothers) lists in the Hindu texts like the Mahabharata (Chapter 'Vana-parva'), the Devi Purana and the Vishnudharmottara Purana. She is often depicted in the Saptamatrika group in sculptures, examples of which are Ellora and Elephanta caves. Though she is always portrayed last (rightmost) in the group, she is sometimes referred to as the leader of the group. While other Matrikas are considered as Shaktis (powers) of male divinities and resemble them in their appearance, Chamunda is the only Matrika who is a Shakti of the great Goddess Devi rather than a male god. She is also the only Matrika who enjoys independent worship of her own; all other Matrikas are always worshipped together.

The Devi Purana describe a pentad of Matrikas who help Ganesha to kill demons. Further, sage Mandavya is described as worshipping the Māṭrpaňcaka (the five mothers), Chamunda being one of them. The mothers are described as established by  the creator god Brahma for saving king Harishchandra from calamities. Apart from usual meaning of Chamunda as slayer of demons Chanda and Munda, the Devi Purana gives a different explanation: Chanda means terrible while Munda stands for Brahma's head or lord or husband.

In the Vishnudharmottara Purana - where the Matrikas are compared to vices - Chamunda is considered as a manifestation of depravity. Every matrika is considered guardian of a direction. Chamunda is assigned the direction of south-west.

Chamunda, being a Matrika, is considered one of the chief Yoginis, who are considered to be daughters or manifestations of the Matrikas. In the context of a group of sixty-four yoginis, Chamunda is believed to have created seven other yoginis, together forming a group of eight. In the context of eighty-one yoginis, Chamunda heads a group of nine yoginis.

Worship

A South Indian inscription describes ritual sacrifices of sheep to Chamunda. In Bhavabhuti's eighth century Sanskrit play, Malatimadhva describes a devotee of the goddess trying to sacrifice the heroine to Chamunda's temple, near a cremation ground, where the goddess temple is. A stone inscription at Gangadhar, Rajasthan, deals with a construction to a shrine to Chamunda and the other Matrikas, "who are attended by Dakinis" (female demons) and rituals of daily Tantric worship (Tantrobhuta) like the ritual of Bali (offering of grain).

The Chapa dynasty worshiped her as their Kuladevi. The Kutch Gurjar Kshatriyas worship her as Kuladevi and temples are in Sinugra and Chandiya. Alungal family, a lineage of Mukkuva caste — (Hindu caste of seafarer origin) in Kerala — worship Chamundi in Chandika form, as Kuladevta and temple is in Thalikulam village of Thrissur, Kerala. This is an example of Chamunda worship across caste sects.

Temples

The goddess's image is flanked by the images of Hanuman and Bhairava. Another temple, Chamunda Nandikeshwar Dham, also found in Kangra, is dedicated to Shiva and Chamunda. According to a legend, Chamunda was enshrined as chief deity "Rudra Chamunda", in the battle between the demon Jalandhara and Shiva.
 In Gujarat, two Chamunda shrines are on the hills of Chotila and Parnera.
 There are multiple Chamunda temples in Odisha. The 8th-century Baitala Deula is the most prominent of them, also being one of the earliest temples in Bhubaneswar. The Mohini temple and Chitrakarini temple in Bhubaneswar are also dedicated to Chamunda. Kichakeshwari Temple, near the Baripada and Charchika Temple, near Banki enshrine forms of Chamunda.
 Another temple is Chamundeshwari Temple on Chamundi Hill, Mysore. Here, the goddess is identified with Durga, who killed the buffalo demon, Mahishasura. Chamundeshwari or Durga, the fierce form of Shakti, a tutelary deity held in reverence for centuries by the Maharaja of Mysore.
 The Chamunda Mataji temple in Mehrangarh Fort, Jodhpur, was established in 1460 after the idol of the goddess Chamunda — the Kuladevi and iṣṭa-devatā (tutelary deity) of the Parihar rulers — was moved from the old capital of Mandore by the then-ruler Jodha of Mandore. The goddess is still worshiped by the royal family of Jodhpur and other citizens of the city. The temple witnesses festivities in Dussehra: the festival of the goddess.
 Another temple, Sri Chamundeshwari Kshetram is near Jogipet, in Medak District in Telangana State.
Sree Shakthan Kulangara temple is one of Chamundeshwari temples. It is located in Koyilandy, Kozhikode District in Kerala.
One Chamunda Mata temple is situated in Dewas, Madhya Pradesh, It is situated on a hill top named Tekri above 300 feet. Chamunda Mata in Dewas is also called Choti Mata (the younger sister of Tulja mata, situated at the same hill top).

In Buddhism
In Vajrayana Buddhism, Chamunda is associated with Palden Lhamo. She is seen as a wrathful form of Kali and is a consort of Mahakala and protectress of the Dalai Lama and Panchen Lama of the Gelug school.

In Jainism
Early Jains were dismissive of Chamunda, the goddess who demands blood sacrifice - which is against the primary principle of Ahimsa of Jainism. Some Jain legends portray Chamunda as a goddess defeated by Jain monks like Jinadatta and Jinaprabhasuri.

Another Jain legend tells the story of conversion of Chamunda into a Jain goddess. According to this story, Chamunda sculpted the Mahavir image for the temple in Osian and was happy with the conversions of Hindu Oswal clan to Jainism. At the time of Navaratri, a festival that celebrates the Hindu Divine Mother, Chamunda expected animal sacrifices from the converted Jains. The vegetarian Jains, however, were unable to meet her demand. Jain monk Ratnaprabhasuri intervened, and as a result, Chamunda accepted vegetarian offerings, forgoing her demand for meat and liquor. Ratnaprabhasuri further named her Sacciya, one who had told the truth, as Chamunda had told him the truth that a rainy season stay in Osian was beneficial for him. She also became the protective goddess of the temple and remained the clan goddess of the Osvals. The Sachiya Mata Temple in Osian was built in her honour by Jains. Some Jain scriptures warn of dire consequences of worship of Chamunda by the Hindu rites and rituals. Many Kshatriyas and even the Jain community worship her as her Kuladevi or family/clan deity.

See also
 Mahakali
 Maheshvari
 Tridevi

References

Further reading

 Wangu, Madhu Bazaz (2003). Images of Indian Goddesses. Abhinav Publications. 280 pages. .
 Pal, P. The Mother Goddesses According to the Devipurana in Singh, Nagendra Kumar, Encyclopaedia of Hinduism, Published 1997, Anmol Publications PVT. LTD.,
 Kinsley, David (1988). Hindu Goddesses: Vision of the Divine Feminine in the Hindu Religious Traditions. University of California Press. 
 Kalia, Asha (1982). Art of Osian Temples: Socio-Economic and Religious Life in India, 8th-12th Centuries A.D. Abhinav Publications. .
 Handelman, Don. with Berkson Carmel (1997). God Inside Out: Siva's Game of Dice, Oxford University Press US. 
 Moor, Edward (1999). The Hindu Pantheon, Asian Educational Services, . First published: 1810.

External links
 Shri Sachchiyay Mataji (Shri Osiya Mataji) A form (avatar) of Chamunda Devi
 Chamunda Devi Temple (Chamunda Nandikeshwar Dham), Himachal Pradesh

Hindu goddesses
Forms of Parvati
War goddesses
goddesses